is a retired Japanese professional pitcher.

External links

Living people
1964 births
Baseball people from Shiga Prefecture
Japanese baseball players
Nippon Professional Baseball pitchers
Nippon Ham Fighters players
Seibu Lions players
Aichi Institute of Technology alumni